Zamboanga del Sur (Cebuano: Habagatang Zamboanga; Subanen: S'helatan Sembwangan/Sembwangan dapit Shelatan; Chavacano: Zamboanga del Sur;), officially the Province of Zamboanga del Sur, is a province in the Philippines located in the Zamboanga Peninsula region in Mindanao. Its capital is the city of Pagadian. Statistically grouped with Zamboanga del Sur is the highly urbanized City of Zamboanga, which is geographically separated and a chartered city and governed independently from the province.

The province borders Zamboanga del Norte to the north, Zamboanga Sibugay to the west, Misamis Occidental to the northeast, and Lanao del Norte to the east. To the south is the Moro Gulf.

Etymology
The name of Zamboanga is the Hispanicized spelling of the Sinama term for "mooring place" - samboangan (also spelled sambuangan; and in Subanen, sembwangan), from the root word samboang ("mooring pole"). "Samboangan" was the original name of Zamboanga City, from where the name of the peninsula is derived from. "Samboangan" is well-attested in Spanish, British, French, German, and American historical records from as far back as the 17th century.

This is commonly contested by folk etymologies which instead attribute the name of Zamboanga to the  Indonesian word jambangan (claimed to mean "place of flowers", but actually means "pot" or "bowl"), usually with claims that all ethnic groups in Zamboanga were "Malays". However, this name has never been attested in any historical records prior to the 1960s.

History

.

Early history 
The original inhabitants of the Zamboanga Peninsula were the Maguindanao, and Subanen, who settled along the riverbanks in inland areas; and the various Sama-Bajau and Yakan ethnic groups who settled in coastal areas. Tausūg settlers from northeastern Mindanao also migrated to the region in the 13th century.

The region was additionally settled by migrants (mostly from the Visayas islands) after World War II. Together with the original settlers, these pioneers helped develop Zamboanga del Sur into the abundant and culturally diverse province that it is.

As part of the Zamboanga province 
Historically, Zamboanga was the capital of the Moro Province in western Mindanao, which comprised five districts: Cotabato, Davao, Sulu, Lanao, and Zamboanga. In 1940, these districts became individual provinces. Zamboanga City became the capital of Zamboanga province. Soon after World War II, the provincial capital was transferred to Dipolog. Molave was created as the provincial capital in 1948.

Creation as Zamboanga del Sur 
On June 6, 1952, through Republic Act No. 711, Zamboanga del Sur was carved out from the former Zamboanga province that encompassed the entire peninsula in southwestern Mindanao. As the 52nd province of the Philippines, it originally consisted of 11 towns with the City of Zamboanga and the Island of Basilan, which were later expanded into 42 municipalities and one city, Pagadian, its capital.

This happened in the midst of the postwar period, a time when Mindanao was peaceful and increasingly progressive. Ethnic tensions were minimal, and there was essentially no presence of secessionists groups in Mindanao.  Tensions in Mindanao mostly began to rise only as the 1970s approached, as a result of social and economic tensions which affected the whole country.

The Marcos era 

The late 1960s in Mindanao saw a rise in land dispute conflicts arising from the influx of settlers from Luzon and Visayas, and from the Marcos administration’s encouragement of militia groups such as the Ilaga.  News of the 1968 Jabidah massacre ignited a furor in the Moro community, and ethnic tensions encouraged with the formation of secessionist movements, starting from the largely political Muslim Independence Movement and Bangsamoro Liberation Organization, and eventually the Moro National Liberation Front (MNLF), and the Moro Islamic Liberation Front (MILF). Additionally, an economic crisis in late 1969, violent crackdowns on student protests in 1970, and 1971, and eventually the declaration of Martial Law all led to the radicalization of many students.  Many of them left schools in Manila and joined New People's Army units in their home provinces, bringing a Communist rebellion in the Philippines to Mindanao for the first time.

1982 was a particularly bloody year for Zamboanga del Sur under the Marcos dictatorship, as two massacres happened in the province that year.  On February 12, 1982, members of the Ilaga killed 12 persons in Dumingag, Zamboanga del Sur, allegedly to avenge the death of their leader, who they believed had been killed by the NPA. And on May 25, 1982, three people were killed and eight people were injured when the administration's airplanes dropped bombs on Barangay Dimalinao of Bayog, Zamboanga del Sur, allegedly as reprisal for the killing of 23 soldiers by supposed rebels two days earlier. Days later, two more men from the community were picked up and killed, and a few months later, the residence of Bayog's Jesuit parish priest was strafed after he had written letters decrying the torture and harassment of the indigenous Subanon people from his parish, whom government had tagged as communist supporters.

Separation of Zamboanga Sibugay 
Political developments in February 2001 saw another major change in the territorial jurisdiction of Zamboanga del Sur. Its inhabitants voted to create a new province out of the third congressional district, named Zamboanga Sibugay.

Geography
Zamboanga del Sur covers a total area of  occupying the southern section of the Zamboanga peninsula in western Mindanao. It is located at longitude 122° 30"" and latitude 7° 15"" north. The province is bordered on the north by Zamboanga del Norte, west by Zamboanga Sibugay, northeast by Misamis Occidental, east by Lanao del Norte, southeast by the Illana Bay, and south by the Moro Gulf.

Topography

Stretching northward from Sibugay in the southwest and running along the northern boundary to Salug Valley in the east is the province’s mountainous countryside. The coastal plains extend regularly from south to west then spread into wide flat lands when reaching the coastal plains of the Baganian peninsula in the southeast.

The longest river in Region IX, the Sibugay River gets its water from the mountains of Zamboanga del Sur most specifically in Bayog and Lakewood, from where it flows into Sibuguey Bay which is now part of Zamboanga Sibugay. Other notable rivers are the Kumalarang River, the Dinas River with its headwaters in the Mount Timolan Protected Landscape, and Salug River in Molave.

Climate
The province has a relatively high mean annual rainfall: . Temperature is relatively warm and constant throughout the year: .

Administrative divisions
Zamboanga del Sur comprises 26 municipalities and 1 component city, organized into two congressional districts and further subdivided into 681 barangays.

Traditionally grouped with Zamboanga del Sur is the highly urbanized city of Zamboanga, which is administratively independent from the province.

Demographics

Religion
Most of the inhabitants in Zamboanga del Sur are Roman Catholics.  Other Christian groups are  Baptists, Methodists, Aglipayans, Church of Christ of Latter Day Saints, Iglesia ni Cristo, Jehovah's Witnesses, Seventh-day Adventist and other Evangelical Christians. There is a large Muslim minority.

Languages
The most commonly spoken first language in the province is Cebuano, while Chavacano is the majority language in and around Zamboanga City. Tagalog and English are also widely used and understood as the national official languages, with the former used as a lingua franca between various non-local ethnic groups or recent migrants and their families. Minority languages include Maguindanaon,  Subanen, Tausug, Maranao, and Iranun.

Economy

The economy is predominantly agricultural. Products include coco oil, livestock feed milling, rice/corn milling, including the processing of fruits, gifts and housewares made from indigenous materials like handmade paper, roots, rattan, buri, and bamboo; wood-based manufacture of furniture and furniture components from wood, rattan, and bamboo; marine and aquaculture including support services; construction services and manufacture of marble, concrete, and wooden construction materials. There are also mining areas in the province, such as those found in the municipality of Bayog managed by TVI, a Canadian-based mining firm which concentrates on gold mining, and the Cebu Ore Mining which is handling the Ore-Copper-Steel mines. There are also small-scale mines in the municipality of Dumingag.

Government
Governor:
 Victor J. Yu (PDP-Laban)

Vice Governor:
 Roseller L. Ariosa (UNA)

Representatives: 
 1st District - Divina Grace C. Yu (PDP-Laban)
 2nd District - Leonardo L. Babasa Jr. (PDP-Laban)

Board Members:

 1st District:
 Baldomero Fernandez (PDP-Laban)
 Rogelio Saniel (UNA)
 Cesar Dacal Jr. (PDP-Laban)
 Francisvic Villamero (PDP-Laban)
 Almando Sanoria (NUP)

 2nd District:
 Juan Regala (PDP-Laban)
 Basilio Vidad (PDP-Laban)
 Raul Famor (PDP-Laban)
 Ronaldo Poloyapoy (PDP-Laban)
 Jennifer Mariano (PDP-Laban)

 Ex-Officio:
 ABC President: 
 PCL President: Teomila Nobleza (PDP-Laban)
 SK Federation President: Vergel Pilar

References

External links

 
 
 Official website of Zamboanga del Sur
 Daily Zamboanga Times

 
Provinces of the Philippines
Provinces of Zamboanga Peninsula
Zamboanga Peninsula
States and territories established in 1952
1952 establishments in the Philippines